USS LSM-397 was a 520-ton (empty) Landing Ship Medium (LSM) of the United States Navy. Built at Charleston Navy Yard, South Carolina, and commissioned in July 1945, she served with the U.S. Atlantic Fleet for her entire Navy career, initially with the Amphibious Force. She was reassigned to the Service Force in May 1954. LSM-397 was decommissioned in February 1958, and was sold in May 1958.

References

External links
 

Ships built in Charleston, South Carolina
World War II amphibious warfare vessels of the United States
1945 ships
LSM-1-class landing ships medium